Handleyomys melanotis, also known as the black-eared oryzomys or black-eared rice rat, is a species of rodent in the genus Handleyomys of family Cricetidae. It is found in coastal lowland forest in western Mexico.

References

Literature cited

Mammals of Mexico
Handleyomys
Mammals described in 1893
Taxa named by Oldfield Thomas
Taxonomy articles created by Polbot